Cayler Prairie State Preserve is a 160-acre land parcel of tallgrass prairie located in the northwest region of the U.S. state of Iowa in Dickinson County near Spirit Lake.  It is a National Natural Landmark.

Description
Cayler Prairie is dominated by big bluestem grass.  Prairie forbs include (in spring) golden alexander and  Lambert's crazyweed; (in summer) sawtooth sunflower and prairie rose; and (in fall) Missouri goldenrod, New England aster and dotted gayfeather.  The prairie rose that blooms here is the state flower of Iowa.

Adjacent wetlands are managed in combination with the prairie, creating a managed land complex of 1,204 acres.  Historically, much of the visitation to the prairie has been connected with wetland and upland wildfowl hunting.

The prairie was uncovered by botanist Ada Hayden in 1944, who recognized tallgrass plants growing in a hayfield.  She recommended that it be preserved as one of the last remaining patches of old-growth tallgrass prairie in Iowa.  In 1958, the Cayler family - who had owned the land since frontier settlement - sold the land parcel to the Iowa Conservation Commission.  The tallgrass parcel was named as a National Natural Landmark in 1966, and was dedicated as a state nature preserve in 1971.  Bufferland was purchased in 1998.

References

External links
 U.S. Geological Survey Map at the U.S. Geological Survey Map Website. Retrieved December 7th, 2022.

National Natural Landmarks in Iowa
Protected areas of Dickinson County, Iowa
 Grasslands of Iowa
Protected areas established in 1971
1971 establishments in Iowa